Isaac Lievendal was a Spanish engraver, who resided at Granada in the reign of Philip IV (1621-1665).

References

Spanish engravers
Spanish Baroque painters
17th-century Spanish people
17th-century engravers